Lone Tree Lake may refer to:
Lone Tree Lake, a lake in Brown County, Minnesota
Lone Tree Lake, a lake in Lyon County, Minnesota
Lone Tree Lake, a lake in Yellow Medicine County, Minnesota
Lone Tree Lake, a lake in Sheridan County, Montana
Lone Tree Lake (Clark County, South Dakota)
Lone Tree Lake (Deuel County, South Dakota)